The Shell Scotford Upgrader is an oilsand upgrader, a facility which processes crude bitumen (extra-heavy crude oil) from oil sands into a wide range of synthetic crude oils. The upgrader is owned by Athabasca Oil Sands Project (AOSP), a joint venture of Shell Canada Energy (60%), Marathon Oil Sands L.P. (20%) and Chevron Canada Limited (20%).  The facility is located in the industrial development of Scotford, just to the northeast of Fort Saskatchewan, Alberta in the Edmonton Capital Region.

Site
The Scotford Upgrader is a part of a larger site known as Shell Scotford located 40 km northeast of Edmonton, Alberta. Shell Scotford comprises three operating units: the Upgrader, a Refinery, and a Chemical plant.  The Scotford Cogeneration Plant is also located on the site. Currently, work is being done on the first Upgrader expansion. In 1984, Shell opened both the Refinery and Chemical plant on the Scotford site. As one of North America's most modern and efficient refineries, the Scotford Refinery was the first to exclusively process synthetic crude oil from Alberta’s oil sands. Benzene that is produced during the refining process is sent to the adjacent Chemical plant and is used in the production of Styrene Monomer, a chemical needed to make many of the hard plastics people use daily. In 2000, a glycols plant was opened at Scotford Chemicals. Much of the output of the Scotford Upgrader is sold to the Scotford Refinery. Both light and heavy crudes are also sold to Shell's Sarnia Refinery in Ontario. The rest of the synthetic crude is sold to the general marketplace.

History of Scotford

In 1891, a group of immigrants from Galicia, Austria settled on the land south of the North Saskatchewan River, near the South Victoria Trail. Philip Krebs, along with his son John, settled on the north side of South Victoria Trail. Their home became a popular stopping place for those travelling along the trail. Besides being a hospitable natured man, John was fluent in four European languages (German, English, Polish, and Ukrainian) and could speak Cree - making him popular with those who stopped by. 

When the Canadian Northern Railway was being built into Fort Saskatchewan, Philip Krebs’ homestead was a natural place for a stop. In 1905, a loading station was erected there, and on the siding of the building was the name “Scotford” (named after Walter Scott and Alexander Rutherford, the premiers of the two provinces – Saskatchewan and Alberta - that were formed that same year). The area is still referred to by that name.

Description
It was shut down after being damaged in a fire 19 November 2007. The production was resumed in December 2007.

The facility uses hydrogen addition to convert the bitumen from CNRL's Muskeg River Mine in the  Athabasca oil sands into refinery-ready sweet, light crude oil. The Muskeg River Mine is the first commercial unit using Shell's Enhance froth treatment technology — a process for removing sand, fine clay and water from oil sands froth to make clean bitumen suitable for upgrading via hydrogen addition. 

According to Shell, the hydrogenation process is well suited to the very clean bitumen produced at the Muskeg River Mine, and results in the upgrader producing more light crude oil than it inputs in the form of heavy bitumen. It also produces lower levels of sulfur dioxide emissions than the alternative coking method which removes carbon to produce petroleum coke as a by-product. The Scotford Upgrader has its own hydrogen manufacturing unit and produces most of the hydrogen required for the hydrogen-addition process.

In May 2007, the US$9 billion to US$11.3 billion expansion contract was awarded to TIC, Bantrel Constructors, PCL & KBR. KBR built 160 modules and performed construction work for the Atmospheric and Vacuum (A&V) unit and Sulphur Recovery Unit (SRU). Bantrel completed the tank farm, Utilities, Waterblock and Flare units, PCL completed the Residue Hydroconversion Complex (RHC) and TIC constructed the Hydrogen Manufacturing Unit (HMU) .

See also
Alberta's Industrial Heartland
Albian Sands
 Husky Lloydminster Refinery, Lloydminster (Husky Energy), 
 Scotford Upgrader, Strathcona County (Shell Oil Company), 
 Strathcona Refinery, Strathcona County (Imperial Oil), 
 Sturgeon Refinery, Sturgeon County (North West Redwater Partnership — Canadian Natural Resources and North West Refineries),    
 Suncor Edmonton Refinery, Strathcona County (Suncor Energy),

References

External links
 [www.bechtel.com/assets/files/PDF/DetailDesign.pdf Upgrader Design Details]
Scotford Upgrader (Shell Canada website)
Scotford Complex (Shell Canada website)
Muskeg River Mine (Shell Canada website)
(Oil Sands Magazine)

Petroleum technology
Bituminous sands of Canada
Petroleum industry in Canada
Oil refineries in Canada
Buildings and structures in Alberta
Shell plc buildings and structures
Strathcona County